The Paradise Dam, also known as the Burnett River Dam, is a roller compacted concrete (RCC) gravity dam across the Burnett River, located between Coringa and Good Night northwest  and  southwest of  in the Wide Bay-Burnett region of Queensland, Australia. Built for irrigation, the impoundment created by the dam is called Lake Paradise.

In September 2019, concerns about the structural stability of the dam resulted in the water levels in the dam being lowered to 42% of its maximum capacity. In 2020 a report found that the roller-compacted concrete was "intrinsically incapable" of achieving the required standard for safety.

Location and features
The dam is named for the ghost town of Paradise, which is now under water following construction.

Approval to build the dam was given in 2002. It was constructed on behalf of the Queensland Government between 2003 and 2005. The dam is owned by a government-owned corporation, Burnett Water. Since construction was completed in December 2005, it has been operated by another Queensland government-owned corporation, Sunwater.  Construction of the  capacity dam cost A$240 million to complete and was intended to assist the social and economic growth of the region.

The dam is also significant in that it has been the centre of a controversial fishway designed to allow movement of fish upstream and downstream of the dam wall, including the endangered Queensland lungfish.

When the Paradise Dam is full, water is released over a stepped spillway followed by a stilling basin. The chute is followed by a stilling basin before rejoining the natural river course.

Between 2010 and 2013, the spillway system passed four major events, thus mitigating the effects of flood in the downstream catchment including the city of Bundaberg. The peak discharges were experienced in December 2010, January 2011, January 2013 and in March 2013.

Fishways

An upstream fishway, known as the upstream fishlift, was installed on the dam for a cost of $12 million. It consists of a  caged container known as the hopper that sits at the downstream base of the dam wall. When operating, water is passed through the hopper to attract fish into it. The hopper is lifted over the dam wall to release any fish that have entered the hopper into the reservoir. The hopper is then returned to the base of the dam and the cycle repeated.

A downstream fishway, known as the downstream fishlock, was installed on the dam for a cost of $8 million. It consists of an inlet chamber on the upstream side of the dam wall in the reservoir and a pipe to the downstream side of the dam. When operating, fish are attracted into the inlet chamber by flowing water.

The downstream fishway was not operated from the completion of the dam in December 2005 until February 2009 due to water levels in the dam being beneath the entrance of the fishway.  Since the dam commenced operation, the upstream and downstream fishways have not operated for approximately 60% of the time due to a combination of low water levels, mechanical failure, and being shut-down. Operation of the fishway has been limited to only those time when there are low and medium flow releases.

SunWater, the state entity which manages the dam, released final fishway monitoring reports in 2012 for the upstream fishway and the downstream fishway. 25 species different species have been recorded successfully using the upstream fishway.

No lungfish have been recorded using the downstream fishway and very few have been recorded using the upstream fishway. The monitoring indicates that large bodied fish (lungfish, barramundi, mullet, bass) are not using the fishways.

A conservation group unsuccessfully challenged the lack of operation of the fishways on the Paradise Dam in court proceedings in 2008–2010.

Structural concerns 
In September 2019, concerns about the structural stability of the dam resulted in the water levels in the dam being lowered to 42% of its maximum capacity.

In 2020 a report found that the roller-compacted concrete was "intrinsically incapable" of achieving the required standard for safety.

See also

List of dams and reservoirs in Queensland

References

External links
 
 

Dams completed in 2005
Wide Bay–Burnett
Dams in Queensland
2005 establishments in Australia
Gravity dams
Dams with fish ladders